Aregund, Aregunda, Arnegund, Aregonda, or Arnegonda (c. 515/520–580) was a Frankish queen, the wife of Clotaire I (also known as Clothar) king of the Franks, and the mother of Chilperic I of Neustria. She is known for the discovery of her tomb at St. Denis, France, though some questions remain as to the accuracy of this identification.

She is the earliest known queen of Francia.

Marriage
Aregund was the sister of Ingund, one of Clotaire's other wives. Ingund and Aregund were the daughters of Baderic, King of Thuringia.

Clothar and Aregund are believed to have been married no later than 536 CE.

Gregory of Tours claimed that Chlothar married both Aregund and her sister Ingund. It is said that Ingund was quite alarmed at her sister staying single and asked her husband Clotaire to find Aregund a husband. After meeting his sister-in-law, Clotaire is rumored to have announced to his wife that he had found her a suitable husband: himself. While Ingund bore 5 sons and one daughter, Aregund bore one son.

The study of a skeleton long identified as Aregund, suggests she had a child when she was aged about 18.  In Frankish society at the time, girls often married around the age of 15.  The same person (whose identification has been disputed) likely had a limp as osteoarchaeology has shown that she suffered from poliomyelitis at a young age.  If one accepts the original identification, Clotaire may have married his sister-in-law out of pity, as she was not deemed marriageable due to her lameness. Alternatively, as the death rate from childbirth was high, Aregund may have succeeded her sister to foster her orphaned nephews and nieces. Ingund died between 538 and 546 AD.

In 538, Clotaire married Radegund of Thuringia, who was a 1st cousin of Aregund and Ingund.

Widowhood
Aregund and Radegund both survived their husband Clotaire. Aregund was the great-grandmother of the last of the Merovingian kings to wield power, Dagobert I.

Archeology
What was believed to be Aregund's sarcophagus was discovered, among dozens of others, in 1959 in the Saint Denis Basilica by archaeologist Michel Fleury.  It contained remarkably well-preserved clothing items and jewelry.  However, subsequent research throws doubt on the identification.

Research
In an episode of the television series, Digging for the Truth, which aired in May 2006, host Josh Bernstein arranged a DNA test of a sample of her remains to see if it showed any Middle Eastern characteristics. It did not. This was meant to disprove the notion put forward by the Da Vinci Code that the Merovingians were descended from Jesus, though Aregund was merely married into the dynasty, not a blood descendant, so the results of this test are entirely irrelevant.

References

Erlande-Brandenburg, Alain, "Saint-Denis Cathedral", Editions Quest-France, Rennes, n.d.
 Gregory of Tours, History of the Franks http://www.fordham.edu/halsall/basis/gregory-hist.asp
 Wemple, Suzanne Fonay, Women in Frankish Society: Marriage and the Cloister, 500 to 900, University of Pennsylvania Press, 1985

515 births
573 deaths
Merovingian dynasty
Frankish queens consort
Burials at the Basilica of Saint-Denis
6th-century Frankish women
6th-century Frankish nobility
Queen mothers